Delmar W. Anderson (August 20, 1911 – June 23, 1989) was an American football coach.  He was the head football coach at Albion College from 1948 to 1953 and at North Dakota State University from 1954 to 1955.  Anderson's overall record in eight years as a college football head coach was 29–35–4.

In 1952, Anderson led Albion to its first Michigan Intercollegiate Athletic Association championship since 1940 with a 59–7 win over Kalamazoo in the championship game.  The team finished with a 7–1 record with the only loss coming early in the season in a road game against Michigan Tech.  At North Dakota State, Anderson won only one game in two years and compiled a record of 1–17–1.

Before coaching at Albion, Anderson was a backfield coach at Case Institute of Technology and a high school football coach in Adamsville, Ohio, Hillsboro, Ohio, and Youngstown, Ohio.  He graduated from Muskingum College in 1933 and earned a master's degree from the Ohio State University.  He also served in the United States Navy during World War II.

Head coaching record

College

References

1911 births
1989 deaths
American men's basketball players
Albion Britons football coaches
Case Western Spartans football coaches
Muskingum Fighting Muskies football players
Muskingum Fighting Muskies men's basketball players
North Dakota State Bison football coaches
High school football coaches in Ohio
United States Navy personnel of World War II
Ohio State University alumni
People from New Concord, Ohio